Retrospective: The Best of Buffalo Springfield is a compilation album released in February 1969 after the band disbanded in mid-1968.

Track listing
Side one
"For What It's Worth" (Stephen Stills) – 2:37
 Recorded December 5, 1966, Columbia Studios, Los Angeles, California. Lead vocal: Stephen Stills. Bass: Bruce Palmer. Producers: Charles Green and Brian Stone. Running time incorrectly listed on the album's cover as 3:00.
"Mr. Soul" (Neil Young) – 2:35
 Recorded April 4, 1967. Lead vocal: Neil Young. Bass: Palmer.
"Sit Down, I Think I Love You" (Stills) – 2:30
 Recorded August 1966, Gold Star Studios, Los Angeles, California. Lead vocal: Stills, Richie Furay. Bass: Palmer. Producers: Green and Stone.
"Kind Woman" (Richie Furay) – 4:10
 Recorded February–March 6, 1968, Atlantic Studios, New York City & Sunset Sound, Los Angeles, California. Lead vocal: Furay. Bass: Jim Messina. Producer: Messina.
"Bluebird" (Stills) – 4:28
 Recorded April 8, 1967, Sunset Sound. Lead vocal: Stills. Bass: Bobby West.
"On the Way Home" (Young) – 2:25
 Recorded November 15-December 13, 1967, Sunset Sound. Lead vocal: Furay. Bass: Palmer.

Side two
"Nowadays Clancy Can't Even Sing" (Young) – 3:26
 Recorded July 18, 1966, Gold Star Studios. Lead vocal: Furay. Bass: Palmer. Producers: Green and Stone.
"Broken Arrow" (Young) – 6:13
 Recorded August 25 & September 5–18, 1967, Columbia Recording Studios & Sunset Sound. Lead vocal: Young. Bass: Palmer.
"Rock & Roll Woman" (Stills) – 2:44
 Recorded June 22, August 8 & October 8, 1967, Sunset Sound. Lead vocal: Stills. Rhythm guitar: Jim Fielder. Bass: Palmer.
"I Am a Child" (Young) – 2:15
 Recorded February 5, 1968, Sunset Sound. Lead vocal: Young. Bass: Gary Marker. Producer: Messina.
"Go and Say Goodbye" (Stills) – 2:19
 Recorded July 18, 1966, Gold Star Studios. Lead vocal: Stills. Bass: Palmer. Producers: Green and Stone.
"Expecting to Fly" (Young)– 3:39
 Recorded May 6, 1967, Sunset Sound. Lead vocal: Young. Arrangement: Jack Nitzsche.
 Young is the only member of the group who appears on this recording.

Charts

References

Buffalo Springfield compilation albums
1969 greatest hits albums
Atco Records compilation albums
albums produced by Jack Nitzsche
Albums produced by Charles Greene (producer)
Albums produced by Brian Stone
albums produced by Neil Young
albums produced by Jim Messina (musician)